Pro Mach, Inc. (also referred to as ProMach) is a packaging machinery company headquartered in Covington, Kentucky. It was founded in 1998 and is a member of the Packaging Machinery Manufacturers Institute (PMMI).

The firm provides integrated packaging products and machinery for the food, beverage, household goods and pharmaceutical industries. ProMach has 61 manufacturing facilities, 29 sales and support offices, and 46 go-to-market product brands that offer packaging machinery, food processing machinery, label manufacturing, film manufacturing, plastic parts manufacturing, equipment training, and aftermarket parts and service. Its manufacturing facilities and offices are located throughout North America, Europe, South America, and Asia.

ProMach has been listed nine times  on the Inc. 5000, which ranks America's fastest-growing private companies. ProMach most recently ranked No. 4,076 on the 2013 list, ranked No. 4,058 on the 2014 list, ranked No. 4,014 on the 2015 list, ranked No. 4,589 on the 2016 list, ranked No. 4,269 on the 2017 list, ranked No. 4,927 on the 2018 list, and ranked No. 4,493 on the 2019 list. ProMach has also been listed fifteen times on the Deloitte Cincinnati USA 100, which ranks the 100 largest privately held companies in Greater Cincinnati and Northern Kentucky. ProMach most recently ranked No. 32 on the 2012 list, ranked No. 30 on the 2013 list, ranked No. 29 on the 2014 list, ranked No. 24 on the 2015 list, ranked No. 23 on the 2016 list, ranked No. 20 on the 2017 list, ranked No. 14 on the 2018 list, ranked No. 14 on the 2019 list, and ranked No. 13 on the 2020 list. It received the 2010 Manny Green Award from Cincy magazine for manufacturing initiatives and product innovations that helped customers improve package sustainability.

On January 29, 2018 affiliates of Leonard Green & Partners, L.P. agreed to acquire ProMach from affiliates of AEA Investors LP. On March 7, 2018, the acquisition of ProMach by Affiliates of Leonard Green & Partners, L.P. was completed. Financial terms of the transaction were not disclosed.

ProMach was formerly owned by AEA Investors LP, The Jordan Company, Odyssey Investment Partners, LLC, and the Frontenac Company.

ProMach Product Brands

The following is a list of trademarked ProMach product brands that provide equipment and services:

 Allpax
 Axon
 Benchmark
 Bartelt
 BEL
 Brenton
 CL&D
 Code Tech
 Currie by Brenton
 Dekka
 Edson
 EPI Labelers
 Federal
 Ferlo
 FLtècnics
 Fogg
 Greydon
 ID Technology
 IPak
 Jalbert
 KLEENLine
 LSI (Labeling Systems)
 Matrix Packaging Machinery
 Modern Packaging
 NJM Packaging
 Orion
 Ossid
 Pace
 Pacific Packaging
 Packlab
 Panther Industries
 P.E. Labellers
 Pharmaworks
 Quest Industrial
 Reepack
 Rennco
 Roberts PolyPro
 Serpa
 Shuttleworth
 Statco-DSI
 Stock America
 TechniBlend
 Tekkra
 Texwrap
 Weiler
 Wexxar
 Zalkin
 Zarpac
 ZPI

History
July 1998
Pro Mach, Inc. was founded by Frontenac Company and headquarters were set up in Atlanta, Georgia. JP Richard named President and CEO.

November 1998
ProMach acquired Wexxar Packaging of Delta, British Columbia, Canada, provider of case erecting, case forming, and case sealing machinery.

December 1998
ProMach acquired Brenton Engineering of Alexandria, Minnesota, provider of case packing, shrink wrapping, and palletizing machinery.

ProMach also acquired Roberts PolyPro of Charlotte, North Carolina, provider of plastic handles, product merchandising hooks and paperboard finishing/converting machinery.

March 1999
ProMach acquired Axon of Raleigh, North Carolina, provider of heat shrink sleeve and tamper evident band application machinery.

June 1999
ProMach acquired Orion Packaging of Collierville, Tennessee, provider of stretch wrapping and pallet wrapping machinery.

ProMach also acquired Styrotech of Raleigh, North Carolina, provider of stretch sleeve application machinery, to expand Axon's product line offerings.

July 1999
ProMach acquired Ossid of Rocky Mount, North Carolina, provider of tray overwrapping machinery.

January 2000
ProMach acquired Belcor Industries of Richmond, British Columbia, Canada, provider of case forming and case taping machinery.

March 2000
ProMach acquired Rennco of Homer, Michigan, provider of vertical bagging and l-bar sealing machinery.

August 2000
ProMach acquired Robot Aided Manufacturing (RAM) Center of Red Wing, Minnesota, provider of robotic packaging machinery, to expand Brenton's product line offerings.

November 2000
ProMach acquired Fowler Products Company of Athens, Georgia, provider of bottle capping and bottle cap handling machinery.

October 2002
ProMach acquired ID Technology of Fort Worth, Texas, provider of label application, coding, and marking machinery as well as consumable labels.

December 2004
Odyssey Investment Partners acquired ProMach from Frontenac Company and headquarters were moved to Loveland, Ohio. John W. Paxton, Sr. named Chairman and CEO.

April 2005
Bill M. Schult named CFO of ProMach.

August 2005
Mark W. Anderson named President and COO of ProMach.

January 2006
ProMach acquired the Robocaser product line from Mettler-Toledo Hi-Speed to expand Brenton's product line offerings.

February 2006
ProMach acquired Mahaffy & Harder Engineering of Fairfield, New Jersey, provider of horizontal thermoform, fill, seal and tray sealing machinery, to expand Ossid's product line offerings.

May 2006
ProMach acquired The Glennon Group of Milwaukee, Wisconsin, provider of labeling, marking, and packaging systems, to expand ID Technology's regional operations into the Midwest.

ProMach also acquired Allpax Products of Covington, Louisiana, provider of retort and sterilization machinery.

September 2006
ProMach acquired Currie Machinery Company, provider of palletizing and material handling machinery, to expand Brenton's product line offerings.

May 2007
ProMach acquired Markor Marking and Labeling Systems of Fresno, California, provider of labeling and identification products, to expand ID Technology's regional operations into the Western United States.

March 2008
ProMach acquired Labeling Systems (LSI) of Oakland, New Jersey, provider of pressure-sensitive labeling machinery.

April 2008
Mark W. Anderson named President and CEO of ProMach.

June 2009
ProMach acquired IPak Machinery of Vancouver, British Columbia, Canada, provider of corrugated tray forming machinery, to expand Wexxar's product line offerings.

October 2009
ProMach launches ProCustomer brand to focus on branded packaging machinery customer service.

January 2011
ProMach acquired Shuttleworth of Huntington, Indiana, provider of conveyor automation and product handling machinery.

July 2011
The Jordan Company acquired ProMach from Odyssey Investment Partners. The ProMach management team will remain intact.

October 2011
ProMach acquired Matrix Packaging Machinery of Saukville, Wisconsin, provider of vertical form fill seal packaging machinery.

February 2012
ProMach acquired Edson Packaging Machinery of Hamilton, Ontario, Canada, provider of case and tray packaging machinery.

August 2012
ProMach acquired Federal Manufacturing Co of Milwaukee, Wisconsin, provider of liquid bottle filling and capping machinery.

December 2012
ProMach acquired KLEENLine of Newburyport, Massachusetts, provider of sanitary product and material handling and automation machinery.

ProMach also acquired Logmatix of Marietta, Georgia, provider of labeling and identification products, to expand ID Technology's regional operations in the Southeast.

July 2013
ProMach acquired Colet of Toronto, Ontario, Canada, provider of labeling and identification products, to expand ID Technology's regional operations in Canada.

ProMach also acquired the assets of Packaging Synergies of Lancaster, Pennsylvania, provider of flexible packaging machinery.

ProMach also acquired Winco ID of Nashua, New Hampshire, provider of labeling and identification products, to expand ID Technology's regional operations in the Northeast.

November 2013
ProMach acquired the assets of Tekkra Systems of Romeoville, Illinois, provider of shrink wrapping and shrink bundling machinery.

January 2014
ProMach acquired André Zalkin of Montreuil L’Argillé, France, provider of bottle capping and bottle cap handling machinery.

September 2014
ProMach acquired Benchmark Automation of Athens, Georgia, provider of specialty food and bakery material handling and automation machinery.

ProMach also acquired Pace Packaging of Fairfield, New Jersey, provider of bottle unscrambling and orienting machinery.

October 2014
Affiliates of AEA Investors LP acquired ProMach from The Jordan Company. The ProMach management team will remain intact.

September 2015
ProMach acquired Greydon of York, Pennsylvania, provider of flexible packaging coding machinery.

October 2015
Pat M. Mohan named CAO of ProMach.

January 2016
ProMach acquired EPI Labelers of New Freedom, Pennsylvania, provider of flexible packaging labeling machinery.

February 2016
ProMach acquired Texwrap Packaging Systems of Washington, Missouri, provider of shrink wrapping machinery.

May 2016
ProMach acquired NJM Packaging of Montreal, Quebec, Canada, provider of pharmaceutical and integrated packaging line machinery.

July 2016
ProMach acquired Zarpac of Oakville, Ontario, Canada, provider of packaging line engineering, integration, and productivity services.

September 2016
ProMach acquired Pacific Packaging of San Clemente, California, provider of rotary and inline bottle filling and capping machinery.

January 2017
ProMach acquired Jalbert Automatisation of Montreal, Quebec, Canada, provider of packaging automation services.

January 2017
ProMach has been named as one of the companies as finalists for its prestigious annual Deal Maker Awards by The Association for Corporate Growth's Cincinnati chapter

April 2017
ProMach acquired Weiler Labeling Systems of Moorestown, New Jersey, provider of high-speed rotary labeling, serialization, and coding machinery.

May 2017
ProMach acquired P.E. Labellers SpA of Porto Mantovano, Italy, provider of high-speed rotary and linear decorative labeling machinery.

September 2017
ProMach launched an updated brand platform consisting of new corporate and product brand logos, as well as updated messaging.

February 2018
Andy W. Moeder named CFO of ProMach.

March 2018
Affiliates of Leonard Green & Partners, L.P. acquired ProMach from affiliates of AEA Investors LP. The ProMach management team will remain intact.

September 2018
ProMach acquired FLtècnics of Girona, Spain, provider of horizontal form fill seal pouch packaging machinery.

February 2019
ProMach acquired Code Tech of Princeton, New Jersey, provider of coding and marking products.

April 2019
ProMach acquired Quest Industrial of Monroe, Wisconsin, provider of robotic integration machinery.

June 2019
ProMach acquired Stock America of Garner, North Carolina, provider of retort and sterilization machinery.

October 2019
ProMach acquired Grip-Pak of Lake Forest, Illinois, provider of multipack can handles.

ProMach also acquired Jet Label and Jet Marking Systems of Edmonton, Alberta, Canada, provider of labeling and identification products, to expand ID Technology's regional operations in Western Canada.

January 2020
Bret C. Ranc named COO of ProMach.

March 2020
ProMach acquired Pharmaworks of Odessa, Florida, provider of blister packaging machinery.

July 2020
ProMach acquired Modern Packaging of Deer Park, New York, provider of cup and tray filling machinery.

August 2020
ProMach acquired Fogg Filler of Holland, Michigan, provider of rotary liquid filling machinery.

September 2020
ProMach acquired Panther Industries of Highlands Ranch, Colorado, provider of print and apply labeling machinery.

October 2020
ProMach acquired Statco-DSI of Huntington Beach, California, provider of processing machinery, engineering, and integration services.

January 2021
ProMach acquired Bartelt of Sarasota, Florida, provider of horizontal form fill seal packaging machinery.

February 2021
ProMach acquired Serpa Packaging of Visalia, California, provider of cartoning machinery.

November 2021
ProMach acquired CL&D Graphics and CL&D Digital of Hartland, Wisconsin, provider of flexible packaging, labeling, and identification products.

February 2022
ProMach acquired TechniBlend and ProBrew of Waukesha, Wisconsin, provider of liquid processing machinery and integration services.

June 2022
ProMach acquired Reepack of Seriate, Italy, provider of flexible film and tray packaging machinery.

November 2022
ProMach acquired Ferlo of San Adrián, Spain, provider of retort and sterilization machinery.

References

Companies established in 1998
Companies based in Kentucky
1998 establishments in the United States
Covington, Kentucky